Trembleur Lake is a lake in the Omineca Country of the Central Interior of British Columbia, Canada, northwest of Fort St. James between Stuart Lake and the south end of Takla Lake.  It is part of the Nechako Lakes. Its name in the Dakelh language is Dzindlat Bun.  It has also been known as Cross Lake.  Trembleur Lake Provincial Park is on its north shore, above the Middle River.  The reserve settlement of Middle River is at that river's mouth into Trembleur Lake.

References

Lakes of British Columbia
Omineca Country
Range 5 Coast Land District